Rizal Golden Coolers, also known as the Emkai-Rizal Xentromall/Golden Coolers for sponsorship reasons with EMKAI Non-Specialized Wholesale Trading, Golden Coolers Plus 50 & Xentro Mall, are a professional basketball team in the Maharlika Pilipinas Basketball League (MPBL).

History
The Crusaders, then known as the Rizal Ankle Breakers which are due to participate in the Maharlika Pilipinas Basketball League, was officially launched on June 9, 2018. The team shortly announced plans to change its name after fans criticized the name for not being related to the team's locality, the province of Rizal. They changed their name within the month to the "Rizal Crusaders" since according to the ball club's owners, the province is known for "crusades, mountaineering and other stuff".

Current roster

Head coaches

All-time roster

Season-by-season records
Records from the 2022 MPBL season:

References

2018 establishments in the Philippines
Basketball teams established in 2018
Maharlika Pilipinas Basketball League teams
Rizal Golden Coolers